Callanga trichocera is a species of beetle in the family Cerambycidae. It was described by Lane in 1973. It is known from Bolivia and Peru.

References

Hemilophini
Beetles described in 1973